John Hornby Harrison (23 May 1908 – 24 September 1964) was a Liberal party member of the House of Commons of Canada.

He was born in Bradford, England, to May (née Smith) and W. H. Harrison. He moved to Canada in 1913, and became an agent, merchant and trader by career.

He was first elected to Parliament at the Meadow Lake riding in the 1949 general election after an unsuccessful bid for the North Battleford riding in the 1945 election. Harrison was re-elected at Meadow Lake for successive terms in 1949, 1953 and 1957. Harrison was defeated in 1958 by Bert Cadieu of the Progressive Conservative party. He was also unsuccessful in unseating Cadieu in the 1963 election.

His son-in-law was former MP, Nova Scotia MLA and Premier of Nova Scotia Gerald Regan, and his grandchildren are Halifax West MP (and former Speaker of the House of Commons) Geoff Regan, journalist and actress Nancy Regan, and actress Laura Regan.

References

External links
 

1908 births
1964 deaths
Members of the House of Commons of Canada from Saskatchewan
Liberal Party of Canada MPs
Canadian merchants
Regan family
British emigrants to Canada